Pseudotricholoma is a genus of fungi in the family Tricholomataceae. The genus contains three species known from North America. Europe, and the Azores. Basidiocarps (fruit bodies) resemble those of the genus Tricholoma, with a dry fibrillose pileus and white to brown lamellae that have adnate to emarginate attachment and stain reddish when damaged, eventually turning black. Microscopically, the basidiospores are smooth, ellipsoid to ellipsoid-oblong, thin-walled and amyloid.   Cheilocystidia are rare to absent and pleurocystidia are absent.  The pileipellis is a cutis and clamp connections are present.  Species in Pseudotricholoma are found on soil in grasslands and woods. They are probably biotrophic, and may be ectomycorrhizal.

Etymology 

Pseudotricholoma means "false Tricholoma".

See also

List of Tricholomataceae genera

References

External links

Tricholomataceae
Agaricales genera